The Esguerra-Bárcenas Treaty was signed between Colombia and Nicaragua on 24 March 1928. Under the terms of the treaty, Nicaragua recognized Colombia's sovereignty over the Archipelago of San Andrés, Providencia and Santa Catalina. Colombia recognized Nicaragua's sovereignty over the Coast of Mosquitos. This treaty is heavily criticized by the Nicaraguan government as it was signed during the United States of America's occupation. 

In 2001, Nicaragua declared that they disputed the agreement and filed a formal complaint before the International Court of Justice in The Hague, claiming maritime boundaries east of longitude 82 of Greenwich, whilst disputing sovereignty over parts of the archipelago of San Andrés. On December 13, 2007, the International Court of Justice recognized the full sovereignty of Colombia over the islands of San Andrés, Providencia and Santa Catalina, and recognized Colombian sovereignty over the cays of Serranilla, Quitasueño, Serrana, Roncador and Bajo Nuevo.
The question of maritime delimitation was tenuously answered, but the Court ruled Colombia's 1969 claim that Nicaragua's maritime boundary was the 82 West Meridian was illegal.

References

Treaties of Colombia
Treaties of Nicaragua
Treaties concluded in 1928
Colombia–Nicaragua relations
Territorial disputes of Colombia
Territorial disputes of Nicaragua